Dr. Jose Corteza Locsin Ancestral House is a two-storey house built in the 1930s in Silay, Negros Occidental Philippines. It has been named as a Heritage Houses of the Philippines by the National Historical Commission of the Philippines.

See also
Dizon-Ramos Museum
Hacienda Rosalia
Museo Negrense de La Salle
Silliman Hall
The Ruins (mansion)

References 

Buildings and structures in Silay
Heritage Houses in the Philippines
Art Deco architecture in the Philippines